Eldorado Air Force Station located  south of San Angelo, Texas was one of the four unique AN/FPS-115 PAVE PAWS, early-warning phased-array radar systems. The 8th Space Warning Squadron, 21st Space Wing, Air Force Space Command operated at Eldorado Air Force Station.

History
Construction of Eldorado Air Force Station began shortly after site selection for the four PAVE PAWS arrays was completed in 1983, with the station achieving its Initial Operational Capacity (IOC) in May 1986 and becoming fully operational in 1987.

As the likelihood of sea-based missile attacks from the Gulf of Mexico decreased, and with the low probability of missile attacks from the South, the United States Air Force decided to close the southern-facing PAVE PAWS sites at Robins Air Force Base and Eldorado, Texas. After closure in 1995 one radar face from Eldorado AFS, along with another from the closed Robins Air Force Base site were moved to Clear Air Force Station, Alaska as part of the BMEWS upgrade in 1998.

Units Stationed
 8th Missile Warning Squadron (1987-1995)

Current status

As of 2006 the station was in mothballs awaiting possible future re-activation.

References

External links
 FAS's Eldorado Air Force Station site
 Article by Eldorado TX resident on simulating the effect of a nuclear attack on the Eldorado AFS

Installations of the United States Air Force in Texas
1987 establishments in Texas
1995 disestablishments in Texas
Military installations closed in 1995
Radar stations of the United States Air Force
Military installations established in 1987